Barry Tyler (born ) is a former rugby union and professional rugby league footballer who played in the 1940s and 1950s.

Playing career

Championship final appearances
Barry Tyler played left-, i.e. number 11, in Bradford Northern's 5-15 defeat by Warrington in the Championship Final during the 1947–48 season, and played left-, i.e. number 11, in the 6-13 defeat by Wigan in the Championship Final during the 1951–52 season at Leeds Road, Huddersfield on Saturday 10 May 1952, in front of a crowd of 48,684.

Challenge Cup Final appearances
Barry Tyler played left-, i.e. number 11, in Bradford Northern's 8–4 victory over Leeds in the 1946–47 Challenge Cup Final during the 1946–47 season at Wembley Stadium, London on Saturday 3 May 1947, in front of a crowd of 77,605, played left-, i.e. number 11, in the 3–8 defeat by Wigan in the 1947–48 Challenge Cup Final during the 1947–48 season at Wembley Stadium, London on Saturday 1 May 1948, in front of a crowd of 91,465, and played left-, i.e. number 11, in the 12–0 victory over Halifax in the 1948–49 Challenge Cup Final during the 1948–49 season at Wembley Stadium, London on Saturday 7 May 1949, in front of a crowd of 95,000.

County Cup Final appearances
Barry Tyler played right-, i.e. number 12, in Bradford Northern's 18–9 victory over Castleford in the 1948–49 Yorkshire County Cup Final during the 1948–49 season at Headingley Rugby Stadium, Leeds on Saturday 30 October 1948.

Club career
Barry Tyler changed code from rugby union to rugby league when he transferred to Bradford Northern during September 1946, and he transferred from Bradford Northern to Doncaster on Thursday 11 August 1955.

References

External links
Search for "Tyler" at rugbyleagueproject.org
Image "The 1947 Team - The 1947 Bradford Northern team that won at Wembley. - Date: 01/01/1947" at rlhp.co.uk
Image "Northern at Fartown -  The Northern side that took on Huddersfield in 1948. Bradford won 7-2 at Fartown. - Date: 30/03/1948" at rlhp.co.uk
Image "Bill Leake clears his line -  Northern full back Bill Leake meets the Halifax defenders as he tries to clear his line at Wembley. - Date: 07/05/1949" at rlhp.co.uk
Search for "Barry Tyler" at britishnewspaperarchive.co.uk

1920s births
Bradford Bulls players
Coventry R.F.C. players
Doncaster R.L.F.C. players
Nuneaton R.F.C. players
Place of birth unknown
Possibly living people
English rugby league players
Rugby league second-rows
English rugby union players
Year of birth unknown